Antonio Giusti (1624–1705) was an Italian painter of the Baroque period, active mainly in Florence. He was a pupil of the painters Cesare Dandini and Mario Balassi. Giusti was known for his landscape paintings, in the style of Salvatore Rosa. Among those who studied with Giusti, was Giovanni Camillo Sagrestani.

References

External links

1624 births
1705 deaths
17th-century Italian painters
Italian male painters
18th-century Italian painters
Painters from Florence
Italian Baroque painters
Italian landscape painters
18th-century Italian male artists